The 1898–99 season was Manchester City F.C.'s eighth season of league football and seventh season in the Football League. The season saw their first title as they won the Football League Second Division, earning promotion to the First Division.

Team Kit

Football League Second Division

Results summary

Reports

FA Cup

Squad statistics

Squad
Appearances for competitive matches only

Scorers

All

League

FA Cup

See also
Manchester City F.C. seasons

References

External links
Extensive Manchester City statistics site

1898-99
English football clubs 1898–99 season